The Summerlin Hospital Medical Center is a private, for-profit hospital owned by Universal Health Services and operated by the Valley Health System. It is located in the Summerlin neighborhood of Las Vegas, Nevada.

As of 2018, the Summerlin Hospital offers 485 beds with private rooms. It is an accredited Chest Pain Center and Primary Stroke Center. The  campus also includes two medical office towers that provide a variety of outpatient services.

History
The Summerlin Hospital Medical Center opened on October 16, 1997. With an initial investment of $80 million, the brand new hospital would include 148 beds, all located in private rooms, and would offer Southern Nevada's first and only hospital-based cancer treatment facility.

Timeline 

 October 1997: Summerlin Hospital Medical Center opens with 148 beds. Vacant space was included in the hospital's design for future expansion.
 December 1999: A new wing for the hospital's intensive care unit opens, as a part of a $1.5 million expansion. The need to expand the hospital came three years earlier than initially expected.
 June 2005: A four-bed pediatric emergency department opens.
 March 2007: A $100 million expansion was announced due to high demand.
 May 2008: A new emergency room opens as part of the second phase of the expansion project.
 June 25, 2008: The hospital breaks ground on the third and final phase of its expansion project. The final phase consists of a six-story patient facility, adding 180 rooms for a new total of 480. A new medical office building, located near the property's northeast corner, was also under development, with a scheduled opening in fall 2008.
 December 2009: Completion of the expansion project, which includes an expanded hospital with over 480 beds, an expanded Emergency Department, an expanded Labor and Delivery unit, a brand new Level III Neonatal Intensive Care Unit, a second medical office building, and a new parking garage.

Services
The Summerlin Hospital Medical Center offers a comprehensive range of health care services, including:

 The Advanced Primary Stroke Center
 The Breast Care Center
 The Cancer Center
 CentRx Pharmacy
 The Children's Medical Center
 Neonatal Intensive Care Unit
 Pediatric Intensive Care Unit
 Pediatric Emergency Room
 Pediatric Therapy Center
 Ear, Nose and Throat
 Emergency Medicine
 Gastroenterology
 The Heart Center
 Advanced Electrophysiology Lab
 The Chest Pain Center
 The Open Heart Program
 Maternity
 The Birthplace at Summerlin Hospital
 Orthopedics
 Outpatient Services
 Palliative Care
 Radiology
 Rehabilitation
 Respiratory Therapy
 The Sleep Study Center
 Social Services
 Surgery
 The Robotic Surgery Institute
 The Women's Health Center
 Wound Care

Heliport

References

External links

 

1997 establishments in Nevada
Buildings and structures in Summerlin, Nevada
Hospital buildings completed in 1997
Hospitals established in 1997
Hospitals in the Las Vegas Valley